Paul Whelan may refer to:
 Paul Whelan (politician) (1943–2019), New South Wales state politician
 Paul F. Whelan, Irish academic 
 Paul Whelan (security director), US citizen and corporate security director arrested in Russia in late 2018 on accusations of being a spy

See also
 Paul Weyland (1888–1972), anti-semitic leader of the Anti Einstein League